Asgiriya Raja Maha Vihara is an ancient Cave temple situated in Gampaha District, Sri Lanka. The temple has been formally recognised by the Government as an archaeological site in Sri Lanka. The designation was declared on 22 November 2002 under the government Gazette number 1264.

Name
It is said that the name of Asgiri was formed after the lost of horse of Prince Uttiya, the brother of King Kelanitissa, in this area.

History

It is believed that the history of this temple goes to the reign of King Valagamba (89-77 BC). According to the legends King Valagamba, who fled from Anuradhapura after invasions from South India in 104 BC, stayed in this historical places from time to time. During the reign of King Parakramabahu VI this Asgiriya Rajamaha Vihara had received the patronage by provincial king Sakalakala Wallabha.

Structures
This cave temple with drip ledges has been constructed with wattle and daub. To the right of the cave temple, a Devalaya can be seen. The image house of the cave temple has been built a little high from the floor ground. A wooden flight of stairs had been made to enter it. Inside the image house, there is a Samadhi Buddha statue with features of art in the Kandyan period. On either side, images of Buddha in Abaya mudra can be seen. The canopy of the cave is decorated with lotus flowers and with various other flower designs.

In the upper ground surface of the rock, a Sannasa (Deed of grant) with the picture of a horse is found. Also, there is a pond made on the rock and the Stupa is situated adjacent to it. In the top portion of the rock surface, there is a stone with a footprint of Buddha. On the other side of the rock surface, a big cave with drip ledges can be sen.

See also
 Asgiriya

References

Buddhist temples in Gampaha District
Buddhist caves in Sri Lanka
Archaeological protected monuments in Gampaha District